MCH may refer to:

Biology and medicine
 Mean corpuscular hemoglobin or mean cell hemoglobin
 Maternal and child health
 Melanin concentrating hormone
 Molecular clock hypothesis
 Microfibrillar collagen hemostat
 Master of Surgery, written as either M.Ch. or Ch.M.

People and entities
 Michael C. Hall, actor
 New Zealand's Ministry for Culture and Heritage

Places

 Ehime Prefectural Matsuyama Central Senior High School, Matsuyama, Ehime, Japan
 Machala, Ecuador (IATA airport code MCH)

 March railway station, England (National Rail station code MCH)

 MCH Arena, football stadium in Herning, Denmark, home to FC Midtjylland

 Municipal Corporation of Hyderabad, the predecessor to Greater Hyderabad Municipal Corporation

Other uses
 Memory Controller Hub, another name for the northbridge or host bridge, which is a microchip on some PC motherboards
 MicroTCA Carrier Hub, a component of the MicroTCA embedded computing standard
 The month of March, in British National Rail abbreviations